Marion Dale Roper (September 15, 1910 – February 10, 1991) was an American diver who competed in the 1932 Summer Olympics.

In the 1932 Olympics she won a bronze medal in the 10 meter platform event at the Los Angeles Olympics. She was born Marion Charlotte Dale, Chicago. She married William Roper and lived in the Los Angeles area until her death.

References

External links
profile

1910 births
1991 deaths
Divers at the 1932 Summer Olympics
Olympic bronze medalists for the United States in diving
American female divers
Medalists at the 1932 Summer Olympics
20th-century American women